The Garfield Elementary School is a historic school building on United States Route 62 in Garfield, Arkansas, near its junction with Arkansas Highway 127. It is a public elementary school of Rogers Public Schools.

It is a single-story rusticated stone building, built in 1941 to replace a nearby building which had fallen into disrepair.  It is a T-shaped structure, with a long east–west section housing offices and classrooms, and a projecting auditorium to the rear.  The prominent features of the main façade are two projecting castellated entrance porticos, which have raised parapets, and segmented-arch openings.

Garfield Elementary feeds into Lingle Middle School and Rogers Heritage High School.

History
Garfield Elementary School (the institution, not the building) was established in 1885.

The building was listed on the National Register of Historic Places in 1996.

The district researched the possibility of making the school compliant with the Americans With Disabilities Act. The district staff wrote in a report in 2019 that doing so for Garfield Elementary would be "beyond expensive".

A person who owned property in Garfield agreed to donate  to the Rogers School District so it could build a new facility, though the district has not yet determined if it wants to build a replacement facility on that site. The school district plans to close the existing Garfield school building and move students to another building that is scheduled to begin operations in 2024.

See also
National Register of Historic Places listings in Benton County, Arkansas

References

External links
 Garfield Elementary School

School buildings on the National Register of Historic Places in Arkansas
School buildings completed in 1941
National Register of Historic Places in Benton County, Arkansas
Schools in Benton County, Arkansas
1885 establishments in Arkansas
1941 establishments in Arkansas
Educational institutions established in 1885
Rustic architecture in Arkansas